Guilherme Santa Graça do Espírito Santo (30 October 1919 – 25 November 2012), best known as Espírito Santo, was a Portuguese footballer and athlete.

Over the course of 12 seasons he amassed Primeira Liga totals of 117 games and 79 goals, spending all of his career at Benfica, winning seven major titles.

Nicknamed The Black Pearl, he was a prolific goalscorer, with Peyroteo even claiming he was a more complete footballer than him.

Career

Club
Born in Lisbon, of São Toméan descent, Espírito Santo moved to Luanda at the age of 8, and joined the local Benfica delegation, Sport Luanda e Benfica. A fast and agile footballer, his performances led him to being call up to Benfica at age 16, to replace his idol — Vítor Silva – as centre forward. He made his debut on 10 January 1937, still age 17, in a 2–1 win against Vitória de Setúbal, scoring both goals from Benfica.

His 23 goals in two seasons, help the club achieve a three-peat, with Espírito Santo assisting in the final two, in 1936–37, 1937–38. A notable event in his career was match for the 1937–38 Campeonato de Lisboa, when scored 9 goals in a 13–1 trashing of Casa Pia on 5 December 1937. He also took part on historic reversal of a 1–6 deficit in the semi-final of the Taça Portugal against Porto on 18 June 1939, scoring twice in a 6–0 win.

In 1941, he suffered a serious medical condition that sideline him for two whole seasons, only reappearing on 6 February 1944. Moved to the right wing, Espírito Santo helped the club win two more league titles, and two Portuguese Cups, scoring over 50 goals in the process. He retired in 1950, playing his last match on 13 November 1949, with 211 matches and 152 goals scored. For his services, the club awarded him with the Aguia de Ouro (Golden Eagle) medal, and the Olympic Committee of Portugal, with a Fair Play medal.

He had a short stint as manager in the late seventies, managing C.D. Montijo in the final matches of the 1976–77 season, as well Quimigal do Barreiro for two seasons on the second level.

He died in Lisbon on 25 November 2012, at age 93.

International
Espírito Santo represented the Portugal National Football Team on 8 games, with his first cap arriving on 28 November 1937, in 2–1 win against Spain in Vigo. He sole goal came on 9 January 1938, in a 4–0 win against Hungary, and was last capped on 21 April 1945, in an away loss against Switzerland.

Athletics
Espírito Santo ventured briefly into the Track and field competitions. He was spotted when he jump 1.70 meters to go get a ball that stranded off pitch. He held the national record for High Jump for 20 years and was national champion for Long Jump and Triple Jump in 1938.

Personal life
Espírito Santo's brother, Renato, was also an athlete for Benfica.

Honours

Football
Benfica
Campeonato da Liga/Primeira Divisão: 1936–37, 1937–38, 1941–42, 1942–43, 1944–45, 1949–50
Taça de Portugal: 1939–40, 1943–44, 1948–49
Campeonato de Lisboa: 1939–40

Athletics
Benfica
Portugal High Jump Record - (1,88m) from 1940-1960
Portugal Long Jump Record - (6,89m) from 1938–1940
Portugal Triple Jump Record - (14,015m) from 1938–1940

References
General
 

Specific

External links
 
 
 

1919 births
2012 deaths
Footballers from Lisbon
Portuguese people of São Tomé and Príncipe descent
Association football wingers
Association football forwards
Portuguese footballers
Portugal international footballers
S.L. Benfica footballers
Portuguese football managers
Primeira Liga managers